"Close Your Eyes" is a song written by Chuck Willis and performed by The Five Keys.  It reached number 5 on the U.S. R&B chart in 1955.

Other charting versions
The Skyliners released a version of the song as a single in 1961 which reached number 105 on the U.S. pop chart.
The Three Degrees released a version of the song as a single in 1965 which reached number #126 on the U.S. pop chart.
Peaches & Herb released a version of the song as a single in 1967 which reached number 4 on the U.S. R&B chart and number 8 on the U.S. pop chart.  Their version ranked number 71 on Billboard magazine's Top 100 singles of 1967.
Aaron Neville featuring Linda Ronstadt released a version of the song as a single in 1992 which reached number 2 on the UK Singles Chart, number 38 on the U.S. adult contemporary chart and number 90 on the Canadian Singles Chart.  It was featured on Neville's 1991 album, Warm Your Heart.

Other versions
Ray Noble Orchestra with Al Bowlly released an original version of this song in 1933/4.
Steve and Eydie released a version of the song as a single in 1955, but it did not chart.
Jaye P. Morgan released a version of the song as the B-side to her 1961 single "Catch Me a Kiss".
The Bobbettes released a version of the song as a single in 1963, but it did not chart.
The Dells released a version of the song on their 1968 album There Is.
Houston Person released a version of the song on his 1969 album Goodness!.
Earl Lewis and The Channels released a version of the song as the B-side to their 1973 single "Work with Me Annie".
General Kane released a version of the song on their 1987 album Wide Open.

References

1955 songs
1955 singles
1961 singles
1963 singles
1965 singles
1967 singles
1992 singles
Songs written by Chuck Willis
The Five Keys songs
The Skyliners songs
Swan Records singles
Peaches & Herb songs
Eydie Gormé songs
Steve Lawrence songs
Aaron Neville songs
Linda Ronstadt songs
Capitol Records singles
Coral Records singles